Issaquah Creek is a small stream flowing through the city of Issaquah and nearby communities, in the U.S. state of Washington. Its headwaters are on the slopes of Cougar, Squak, Tiger, and Taylor mountains in the Issaquah Alps. Tributaries of Issaquah Creek include Holder Creek, Carey Creek, Fifteen-mile Creek, McDonald Creek, East Fork Issaquah Creek, and North Fork Issaquah Creek. The creek empties into the south end of Lake Sammamish. The lake's outlet is the Sammamish River, which in turn empties into Lake Washington and ultimately Puget Sound.

Issaquah Creek's drainage basin is over 75% forest land and less than 10% urbanized or cleared. The basin is one of the three most significant in urbanizing King County. The upper and middle portions of the basin have been identified as a Regionally Significant Resource area due to their exceptional fish habitat and undeveloped character. The entire basin is an important salmon migration and spawning area. Carry Creek and Holder Creek, in the upper Issaquah Creek basin, provide particularly excellent salmonid habitat.

Every October people gather on its shores to watch the salmon traveling upstream. Fishing in Issaquah Creek is only practiced legally by anglers under age 15 and by the local Native Americans..

Issaquah Creek and its tributaries support Chinook, coho, and sockeye salmon (both anadromous sockeye and resident kokanee), coastal cutthroat trout, and steelhead. Chinook and coho are reared by the state Issaquah Salmon Hatchery, located three miles upstream from the creek's mouth. The hatchery has been releasing Chinook salmon into Issaquah Creek since 1936. Data for the early 2000s indicate that approximately two million Chinook smolts have been released each year.

See also
 List of rivers of Washington

References

Further reading
 Manning, Harvey. 50+ Trails of Cougar Mountain Regional Wildland Park, Squak Mountain State Park, Lake Sammanmish State Park, Coal Creek Park, May Creek Park.Issaquah: Issaquah Alps Trails Club, 1985.

External links
Issaquah Creek Subarea Map, King County Water & Land Resources Division
Issaquah Creek Basin Map, King County DNRP/WLR GIS

Rivers of King County, Washington
Rivers of Washington (state)